Kudakwashe Chiwandire is a Zimbabwean professional boxer who has held the WBC female interim super-bantamweight title since February 2022.

Professional career
Chiwandire made her professional debut on 28 November 2015, scoring a four-round unanimous decision (UD) victory against Barbara Banda at the National Sports Development Centre in Lusaka, Zambia.

After compiling a record of 4–2–1 (4 KOs), she defeated former world champion Catherine Phiri via split decision (SD) over ten rounds, capturing the vacant WBC female interim super-bantamweight title on 26 February 2022, at the Government Complex in Lusaka.

Professional boxing record

References

Living people
Date of birth missing (living people)
Year of birth missing (living people)
Zimbabwean boxers
Sportspeople from Harare
Super-bantamweight boxers